Russian musket model 1845, percussion, Russian percussion musket of the middle 19. century. Modified rifled version Model 1845/63 was extensively used by the Serbian army in 1863–1878.

History

Serbian army 1830-1863 
Principality of Serbia gained it's autonomy from the Ottoman Empire after the Second Serbian Uprising (1815), and officially became an Ottoman client state under the Russian protectorate in 1830. The first Serbian regular military units were formed by Prince Miloš Obrenović in 1825, formally as a police force called Enlisted Watchmen, in order not to offend the Ottoman authoritees. At first, there were 12 companies (1,147 men) of these mercenaries. In 1830. Serbia was officially permitted by the Ottomans to form an army, and by 1838. Serbia had 2,417 professional (regular) soldiers, armed and uniformed in the European fashion, trained by the former Austrian and Russian officers. Regular army was temporarily disbanded by the new Serbian Government in 1839 (after the exile of Prince Miloš), but was reformed in 1845. under the name of Garrison Soldiers: there were 2 battalions of infantry (8 companies, 2,010 men), one artillery unit (250 men) and one squadron of cavalry (208 men), with the officers about 2,529 men.

As the Regular Army was too small to protect the country from its powerful neighbours (Austria and Ottoman Empire), during the crisis of Hungarian Revolution of 1848, when Serbia was directly threatened by the Austrian invasion, Serbian government resorted to enlistment of all the men available for the military service, the so-called People's Militia. At the time Serbia was (on paper) able to rise 94,000 men (16,000 horsmen), with 40,000 more in reserve, but there was not enough arms nor food for so many. Conscripts were expected to provide their own weapons and clothing, receiving only food and ammunition from the government. In reality, not even half of them had working rifles, mostly old flintlock muskets of the Ottoman and Austrian production.

Russian rifles in Serbia 
In 1856-1858 Serbia imported the first 7.000 modern percussion rifles, Francotte rifle model 1849/56 from Belgium: in 1858, the fall of pro-Austrian government of Prince Aleksandar Karađorđević caused the Austrian government to immediately prohibit any further transport of weapons for Serbia.

In 1858. Prince Miloš Obrenović returned to power in Serbia with the support of France and Russia, who were dissatisfied with the pro-Austrian policy of the Serbian government. His son and heir, Prince Mihailo (ruled 1860–67), led a very ambitious foreign policy, aimed at the liberation of all the South-Slavic peoples.  In 1861. Prince Mihailo founded Ministry of War (led by French colonel Hyppolyte Mondain), doubled the size of the Regular Army (to 3,529 men) and declared the foundation of the Serbian National Militia, which conscripted all the men aged 20–50 for the compulsory military service. People's Militia was divided into the First (men under the age of 35) and the Second class, organized into territorial battalions (62 in number) and regiments (17, one in each county). Ther were also 17 squardons of cavalry, 17 pioneer units of 60 men each, and 6 artillery batteries (1,200 men). Conscripts were expected to provide their own weapons and clothing. Military service was without pay, and militiamen were expected to provide their own weapons and clothing. In 1862. Serbian People's Militia existed on paper only: less than a half of the militiamen had serviceable rifles. Hovever, in 1863. Serbia received some 31.000 (or 39.200) old percussion muskets from Russia (Russian musket model 1845): these muskets vere converted to rifles in Kragujevac and became the standard weapon of the People's Militia.

References 

Rifles of Serbia
Coordinates on Wikidata